El coyote emplumado (English: The Feathered Coyote) is a 1983 Mexican comedy film directed by and starring María Elena Velasco.

Cast
María Elena Velasco as María
Armando Soto La Marina as don Lupe
Carlos Riquelme as Professor Villegas
Noé Murayama as Romano

External links

Mexican comedy films
1983 films
1980s Spanish-language films
1980s Mexican films